Medinipur Division is one of the 5 divisions in the Indian state of West Bengal. It is the westernmost division of West Bengal. Earlier it was a part of Burdwan division and was curved out from it in 2016. The port city of Haldia is located in this division

Districts
It consists of 5 districts:

Demographics

Hindus form the majority of the population of Medinipur division and comprises 79.3% of the population. There is a significant population of various tribes in the district such as Santhal, Mundari, etc. Muslims comprises 10.1% of the population.

References

Divisions of West Bengal
Western Bengal